The Winfield Public Carnegie Library, located at 1001 Millington Street in Winfield, Kansas, is a Carnegie library which was built in c.1912.  It was listed on the National Register of Historic Places in 1988.

Its design is credited to Smith and Parr, architects of Oklahoma City.

References

Libraries on the National Register of Historic Places in Kansas
Library buildings completed in 1912
Cowley County, Kansas
Carnegie libraries in Kansas